was a professional wrestling event promoted by World Wonder Ring Stardom. It took place on February 23, 2022, with a limited attendance due in part to the ongoing COVID-19 pandemic at the time.

Storylines
The event's press conference where the matches were officially announced took place on February 4 and was broadcast on Stardom's YouTube channel. The show featured eight professional wrestling matches that resulted from scripted storylines, where wrestlers portrayed villains, heroes, or less distinguishable characters in the scripted events that built tension and culminated in a wrestling match or series of matches.

Event
The first two pre-show matches were broadcast on Stardom's YouTube channel. In the first one, Mai Sakurai defeated Waka Tsukiyama and Rina in a three-way match to become the number one contender for the Future of Stardom Championship. In the second match, Hanan successfully defended the future title for the second time in her reign against Stars stablemate Momo Kohgo. It was announced that Hanan will defend the title next against Rina on March 26, the first night of the Stardom World Climax 2022. The six-man tag team match between Donna Del Mondo's separate trams of Giulia, Mirai & Thekla and Syuri, Maika & Himeka went down to a 20-minute time-limit draw. Giulia and Syuri had a brief staredown before their confrontation for the World of Stardom Championship on March 26. After Hazuki & Koguma successfully retained the Goddess of Stardom Championship against Mina Shirakawa & Unagi Sayaka, Momo Watanabe stepped up to challenge them alongside a mystery partner which had to be furtherly revealed. The co-main event had AZM defeating Starlight Kid to win the High Speed Championship for the second time in her career. Kid was humble in defeat and sat in the ring. She did not speak but gestured for AZM to take her mask off too as a victory token. The latter refused to take her mask and instead offered her a fist bump out of respect.

The main event portraited Saya Kamitani successfully defending the Wonder of Stardom Championship against Natsupoi. She named Utami Hayashishita who was at ringside doing guest commentary and Tam Nakano as the next challengers at Stardom World Climax. Her Queen's Quest stablemate will receive her title shot on the first night of the event from March 26 while the Cosmic Angels' unit leader will have it on March 27, the second night.

Results

External links
Page Stardom World

References

2022 in professional wrestling
Women's professional wrestling shows
World Wonder Ring Stardom shows
World Wonder Ring Stardom